Patrik Siikanen (born 16 April 2000) is a Finnish professional hockey player playing in Liiga for JYP Jyväskylä. He was drafted by the Edmonton Oilers in the 2018 NHL Entry Draft.

References

External links

2000 births
Living people
Finnish ice hockey forwards
Edmonton Oilers draft picks
JYP Jyväskylä players
Sportspeople from Espoo